Pyn or PYN may refer to:

 Bobby Pyn, an American punk rock vocalist also known as Darby Crash
 pyn, the ISO 639-3 code for the Poyanawa language of Brazil
 PYN, the National Rail code for Penryn railway station, Cornwall, UK

See also